Utopia Lda is a Portuguese design firm providing services in architecture, town planning, objects design, engineering and web design. Its main goal is to create a sustainable environment.

Awards
In April 2004 this firm won the Tektonica Prize.

Works
Utopia 's main emblematic buildings, include:
House in Provezende, (2005)
House in Covilhã, (2006)
Theatre in Ovar, (2007)
House in Mindelo, (2008)

References

External links
Official site, in English, in French, in Spanish and Portuguese.
TEKTONICA Lisbon Fair for Building and Construction

Architecture firms of Portugal
Year of establishment missing